Valentino Degani (14 February 1905 – 8 November 1974) was an Italian footballer who played in the role of goalkeeper.

Club career
Degani was born in Badia Polesine, province of Rovigo. He played 176 matches in Serie A Inter Milan from 1924 to 1937, winning one league title during the 1929–30 season.

International career
With the Italy national football team, Degani won a bronze medal at the 1928 Summer Olympics, although did not feature in a match.

Honours

International 
Italy
Olympic Bronze Medal: 1928

References

1905 births
1974 deaths
Sportspeople from the Province of Rovigo
Italian footballers
Association football goalkeepers
Serie A players
Inter Milan players
Olympic footballers of Italy
Footballers at the 1928 Summer Olympics
Olympic bronze medalists for Italy
Olympic medalists in football
Medalists at the 1928 Summer Olympics
Footballers from Veneto